Christianity is the predominant religion in Tonga, with Methodists having the most adherents.

The constitution of Tonga establishes the freedom of religion, which is respected in practice by both the government and general society, although there are some laws which restrict commerce and broadcast media in accordance with Christian religious norms.

Christianity 
Tongans are ardent churchgoers. Church service usually follows a call and response structure. Singing in the church is often done a cappella. Although a church attends primarily to the spiritual needs of the population, it also functions as the primary social hub.

Sunday in Tonga is celebrated as a strict sabbath, enshrined so in the constitution, and despite some voices to the opposite, the Sunday ban is not likely to be abolished soon. No trade is allowed on Sunday, except essential services, after special approval by the minister of police. Those that break the law risk a fine or imprisonment.

Along with others from Oceania, some Tongan Christians have attempted to develop their own unique theology which addresses the contextual questions offered by people of the Pacific. This includes the coconut theology of the Methodist Sione 'Amanaki Havea or the incarnational theology of the Roman Catholic Bishop Patelesio Finau.

The Church of Jesus Christ of Latter-day Saints in Tonga had 66,361 members on record (about 60% of the population) with 173 congregations as of 2019. According to The Church of Jesus Christ of Latter-day Saints, Tonga has a higher per-capita number of Latter-day Saints than any other country in the world. However, according to the 2011 census, only 18.01% of Tongans belong to LDS Church and Tongans belonging to mainstream Christian denominations represent majority of the population.

Other religions 
Buddhism has begun to gain traction, growing from 0.2% to 0.4% of the population in five years. Hinduism decreased from 104 people in 2006 to 100 in 2010.

The Baháʼí Faith in Tonga started after being set as a goal to introduce the religion in 1953, and Baháʼís arrived in 1954. With conversions and pioneers, the first Local Spiritual Assembly was elected in 1958.  Less than forty years later, in 1996, the Baháʼís of Tonga established their paramount Baháʼí school in the form of the Ocean of Light International School. Around 2004 there were 29 local spiritual assemblies and about 5% of the national population were members of the Baháʼí Faith though the Tonga Broadcasting Commission maintained a policy that does not allow discussions by members of the Baháʼí Faith of its founder, Bahá'u'lláh on its radio broadcasts.

Demographics 
According to the 2011 census, 36% of the population are members of the Free Wesleyan Church, including the king and the majority of the royal family. The Church of Jesus Christ of Latter-day Saints is the next largest group (18%), followed by the Roman Catholic Church (15%), and three further Methodist denominations, the Free Church of Tonga (12%), the Church of Tonga (7%), and the Tokaikolo Christian Church (2.5%). Tonga also has members of the Seventh-day Adventist Church, Anglicans, adherents of the Baháʼí Faith, Hinduism, Buddhism and Muslims, all of which constitutes less than 3% of the population.

Census figures

Religious freedom 
The constitution of Tonga establishes the freedom of religion, with the qualification that this freedom is not used to "commit evil" or to otherwise violate the law. The constitution forbids commercial transactions on Sundays in accordance with the Christian Sabbath, although the tourism industry is granted some exceptions from this rule.

Religious organizations are not required to register with the government, but may do so in order to receive tax exemptions, the right to issue legally recognized marriage certificates, and other privileges. Foreign missionaries may operate in the country without special restrictions.

Public schools may choose to include up to an hour of religious education per week; students are required to attend religious education courses pertaining to the religion that they profess. Many religious organizations operate private schools.

The government allows religious organizations to broadcast programming on TV Tonga and Radio Tonga, officially with the restriction that they must limit their messaging to be "within the limits of the mainstream Christian tradition". Despite this restriction, in the past the Baháʼí Faith community has televised programming, although the community has since discontinued this program. As of 2017, there have been no reports of the government denying requests for air time from any religious organization.

See also
The Church of Jesus Christ of Latter-day Saints in Tonga
Hinduism in Tonga
Tongan religion

External links
Christian videos in the Tongan language
The Free Wesleyan Church of Tonga

References